Wilfrid Girouard (September 9, 1891 – October 26, 1980) was a lawyer, judge and political figure in Quebec. He represented Drummond—Arthabaska in the House of Commons of Canada from 1926 to 1939 as a Liberal member and represented Arthabaska in the Legislative Assembly of Quebec from 1939 to 1942.

He was born in Drummondville, Quebec, the son of Joseph-Éna Girouard and Emma Watkins, and was educated at the Collège d'Arthabaska, the Collège Sainte-Marie, Loyola College and McGill University. Girouard was admitted to the Quebec bar in 1916 and set up practice at Arthabaska with Joseph-Édouard Perrault. In 1926, he was named King's Counsel. Girouard was bâtonnier for Quebec in 1940 and 1941. He was married twice: to Thérèse Marsil in 1923 and to Marie-Louise-Florence Côté in 1949.

He resigned his seat in the House of Commons in 1939 and was elected to the Quebec assembly that year. Girouard served in the Quebec cabinet as Attorney General from 1939 to 1942. In 1942, he was named judge in the Quebec Superior Court for Trois-Rivières district and served in that post until 1963. He died at Quebec City at the age of 89 and was buried at Arthabaska.

References
 

1891 births
1980 deaths
Canadian King's Counsel
Members of the House of Commons of Canada from Quebec
Liberal Party of Canada MPs
Quebec Liberal Party MNAs
Judges in Quebec
People from Drummondville
McGill University alumni